is a former Japanese football player.

Playing career
Sugawara was born in Muroran on June 3, 1976. He joined Verdy Kawasaki (later Tokyo Verdy) from youth team in 1995. On July 19, he debuted and scored goal against Urawa Reds. From 1996, he played many matches as defensive midfielder and center back. The club won the champions 1996 Emperor's Cup and 2nd place 1996 J.League Cup. In 1999, he moved to Brazil and played for Santos. In 2000, he returned to Japan and joined Vissel Kobe. He played many matches as defensive midfielder. In 2006, he returned to Tokyo Verdy. Although the club was relegated J2 League from 2006, he played many matches and the club was promoted to J1 in 2008. However the club was relegated to J2 in a year and his opportunity to play decreased from 2009. He retired end of 2011 season.

He was well known for receiving a red card from the referee Jumpei Iida and being sent off in just 9 seconds after the kick-off of J2 League match between Tokyo Verdy and Sagan Tosu, held on April 15, 2009. This is the fastest sending-off record in the world football history, however, it has not been filed for a Guinness Book of Records until now.

Club statistics

References

External links

1976 births
Living people
Association football people from Hokkaido
Japanese footballers
Japanese expatriate footballers
Japanese expatriate sportspeople in Brazil
Expatriate footballers in Brazil
J1 League players
J2 League players
Tokyo Verdy players
Santos FC players
Vissel Kobe players
Association football midfielders
People from Muroran, Hokkaido